Scenes from the Southside is the second album by Bruce Hornsby and the Range. The single "The Valley Road" was Hornsby's third (and last) Top 10 U.S. hit, peaking at number five on the Billboard Hot 100, and also his first number one on the Billboard Album Rock Tracks chart. It became his third chart-topper on the Billboard adult contemporary chart, following "The Way It Is" and "Mandolin Rain".  Three other notable tracks on the record were the single "Look Out Any Window"; "The Show Goes On", which was featured in Ron Howard's 1991 film Backdraft, as well as the pilot episode of Baywatch; and "Jacob's Ladder", which was written by Bruce and John Hornsby but is most well known as being a number-one hit for Huey Lewis and the News in March 1987.

Track listing

Personnel 

The Range
 Bruce Hornsby – vocals, grand piano, synthesizer, accordion
 Peter Harris – guitar, mandolin
 George Marinelli – guitar, mandolin, backing vocals
 Joe Puerta – bass, backing vocals
 John Molo – drums

Additional personnel
 Huey Lewis – harmonica on "Defenders of the Flag"
 David Roitstein – synthesizer
 Jeff Gerson – percussion
 Jimmy Bralower – drum programming

Production 
 Produced by Bruce Hornsby and Neil Dorfsman
 A&R Direction – Paul Atkinson
 Recorded, Engineered and Mixed by Neil Dorfsman and Eddie King.
 Additional Engineers – Greg Bartheld, Steve "Sound" Cormier, Jim Dineen, Ron Jacobs, Brian Schueble, Julian Stull and Andrew Udoff.
 Mixed at The Grey Room (Hollywood).
 Digital Editing by Bill Dooley at A&M Studios.
 Mastered by Bob Ludwig at Masterdisk (New York, NY).
 Production Coordinator – Sharona Sabbag
 Art Direction – Norman Moore and Ria Lewerke
 Design – Norman Moore 
 Cover Photo – Dennis Keeley
 Inner Photo – Robert Llewellyn
 Management – Tim Neece
 Music Consultant – Steve Watson

Charts and certifications

Weekly charts

Year-end charts

Certifications

References 

1988 albums
Bruce Hornsby albums
RCA Records albums
Albums recorded at Henson Recording Studios